Vilde Kaurin Jonassen (born 1 September 1992) is a Norwegian handball player for Vipers Kristiansand.

Achievements
EHF Champions League:
Winner: 2020/2021, 2021/2022
Bronze medalist: 2018/2019
EHF Cup:
Finalist: 2017/2018
Norwegian League:
Winner: 2017/2018, 2018/2019, 2019/2020, 2020/2021, 2021/2022
Silver medalist: 2016/2017
Norwegian Cup:
Winner: 2017, 2018, 2019, 2020, 2021, 2022/23

References

1992 births
Living people
Sportspeople from Kristiansand
Norwegian female handball players
21st-century Norwegian women